His Wife's Money is a 1920 American silent drama film directed by Ralph Ince and starring Eugene O'Brien, Zena Keefe and Louise Prussing.

Cast
 Eugene O'Brien as Richard Flint
 Zena Keefe as 	Marion Phillips
 Ned Hay as Bob Uppington
 Louise Prussing as 	Eva Uppington
 Cyril Chadwick as 	James Cardwell
 Dorothy Kent as 	Mrs. Ralph

References

Bibliography
 Connelly, Robert B. The Silents: Silent Feature Films, 1910-36, Volume 40, Issue 2. December Press, 1998.
 Munden, Kenneth White. The American Film Institute Catalog of Motion Pictures Produced in the United States, Part 1. University of California Press, 1997.

External links
 

1920 films
1920 drama films
1920s English-language films
American silent feature films
Silent American drama films
American black-and-white films
Films directed by Ralph Ince
Selznick Pictures films
1920s American films